The 1979 World Taekwondo Championships are the 4th edition of the World Taekwondo Championships, and were held in Sindelfingen, Stuttgart, West Germany from October 26 to October 28, 1979. A total of 453 athletes and officials from 38 nations took part in the championships.

Medal summary

Medal table

References

WTF Medal Winners

External links
WT Official Website

World Championships
World Taekwondo Championships
World Taekwondo Championships
Taekwondo Championships
Taekwondo competitions in Germany